The Mowamba River, a perennial river of the Snowy River catchment, is located in the Snowy Mountains region of New South Wales, Australia.

Course and features
The Mowamba River rises within The Snowy Mountains Range, part of the Great Dividing Range, contained within the Kosciuszko National Park, on the northeastern slopes of Mount Terrible. The river descends  over its  course.

Water management
Water from the Mowamba River is diverted to Jindabyne Dam via the Mowamba weir and aqueduct; that is part of the Snowy Mountains Scheme.

On 28 August 2002, the Mowamba Weir was "turned out" allowing environmental water to over top the weir.  Environmental water releases occurred until January 2006.  Since January 2006, environmental water releases to the Snowy River have occurred from Jindabyne Dam as the infrastructure upgrades to the dam wall had been completed.

See also

 List of rivers of New South Wales (L-Z)
 List of rivers of Australia
 Rivers of New South Wales

References

External links
Snowy Flow Response Monitoring and Modelling

Rivers of New South Wales
Snowy Mountains Scheme
Snowy Mountains